Balsas is a city in the state of Maranhão, northeast Brazil. It is located in southern Maranhão, 800 km from the capital of the state, São Luís.

Geography 

Balsas covers an area of 13,141.64 km2, being the largest municipality in Maranhão. The median elevation of the city is 283 meters (810 ft).

Climate  
Balsas has a Savanna tropical climate. Temperature is hot from April through October. It rains from November through March.

Vegetation 
Cerrado is the typical vegetation of the area.  However, due to the advance of agricultural activities, the ecosystems is threatened.

Hydrography 

There are many streams and rivers in the municipality, but the most important is Rio Balsas, which crosses the city.

Demographics 

According to 2001 census, Balsas has 60,613 inhabitants.  82.73% live in Urban areas.  The infant mortality rate is 35.1 deaths /1,000 live births and life expectancy is 64.1 years.

The annual median growth of the population is 4.21%. In 2007 the population was over 78,000 inhabitants. The city is the seat of the Roman Catholic Diocese of Balsas.

References 

Municipalities in Maranhão